Gerard F. Davey (born 1943) is an Irish retired Gaelic footballer who played for club side Clanna Gael and at inter-county level with the Dublin senior football team.

Career

After being overlooked by the Dublin minor and junior selectors, Davey first came to senior inter-county notice when he played a challenge game against Roscommon in October 1962. He went on to win Leinster Championship medals in 1963 and 1965, however, the highlight of his inter-county career was the 1963 All-Ireland final defeat of Galway. Davey also won a County Championship title with the Clanna Gael club.

Honours

Clanna Gael
Dublin Senior Football Championship: 1968

Dublin
All-Ireland Senior Football Championship: 1963
Leinster Senior Football Championship: 1963, 1965

References

1943 births
Living people
Clanna Gael Gaelic footballers
Dublin inter-county Gaelic footballers